MK2 may refer to:
Military
 Mark II (disambiguation), a second version of a product, frequently military hardware. "Mark", meaning "model" or "variant"
 Mk 2 grenade, a hand grenade used by the United States military starting in World War II
 Marte Mk2, a radar-guided helicopter and ship-launched short/medium-range anti-ship missile weapon system developed by Oto Melara and used by the Italian Navy
Vehicles
 Volkswagen Polo, Volkswagen Jetta, and Volkswagen Golf, are automobiles produced in the 1980s and 1990s
 British Railways Mark 2, a type of railway carriage
 The Jaguar Mark 2 is a medium-sized saloon car built from 1959 to 1967 by the Jaguar company in Coventry, England
Games
 Hyperdimension Neptunia Mk2, a Japanese role-playing video game
 Mortal Kombat II, an arcade fighting video game first released in 1993
 Mortal Kombat: Annihilation, a 1997 martial arts action movie, sequel to Mortal Kombat
 Mario Kart 64, the second game in the Mario Kart series, released in 1996 for the Nintendo 64
 Mana Khemia 2: Fall Of Alchemy, a video game for the PS2, released in America in 2009
 VideoSport MK2, an early video game console that was sold in the United Kingdom
other
 Part of the MK postcode area
 MK II FPA (function point analysis), a method for evaluating size of the software systems
 S/2015 (136472) 1, a satellite of Makemake.
 mk2, a French film production and distribution company, and chain of cinemas, founded by Marin Karmitz